The  is a junior and senior high school for girls in Shirokanedai, Minato, Tokyo.

Affiliates
A boarding college in Winchester, Hampshire, England, Winchester Shoei College at the University of Winchester (英国学校法人 Eikoku Gakkō Hōjin), formerly the Shoei Centre at King Alfred's College, is an affiliate of the Shoei Gakuin. It opened in 1982. As of 1983, at one time circa 40 students, all female and aged 18–20, were a part of this programme. They took special courses in British studies and English Language Teaching (ELT).

Features
Shoei Girls' School is a Protestant school, there are places related to Christianity such as Gloria Hall and the chapel. The school is divided by a private road, so you need to be careful when moving around the school. Also, the entire school is connected by narrow loopholes and stairs, so many students get lost in the maze.

References

External links

 Shoei Girls' Junior and Senior High School
 Winchester Shoei College at the University of Winchester 

High schools in Tokyo
Schools in Tokyo